Sujith is a given name. Notable persons with this name include the following people:

Sujith Ariyapala, Sri Lankan cricketer
Sujith Fernando, Sri Lankan cricketer
Sujith Sanjaya Perera, Sri Lanka politician
Sujith Sarang (born 1985), Indian cinematographer
Sujith Shankar, Indian actor
Sujith Somasunder (born 1972), Indian cricketer
Sujith Vaassudev (born 1973), Indian cinematographer

Sinhalese masculine given names